Tregonetha is a village in Cornwall, England, UK.

Tregonetha Downs is situated half a mile south of the village and forms part of the Tregonetha & Belowda Downs SSSI (Site of Special Scientific Interest).

References

Villages in Cornwall